Sardargram railway station is a railway station on Ahmedabad–Udaipur Line under the Ahmedabad railway division of Western Railway zone. This is situated beside National Highway 8 at Nava Naroda, Kuber Nagar in Ahmedabad of the Indian state of Gujarat.

Trains

List of trains that take halt here:
 19703/04 Asarva–Udaipur City Intercity Express
 79401/02 Asarva–Himmatnagar DEMU
 79403/04 Asarva–Himmatnagar DEMU

References

Ahmedabad railway division
Railway stations in Ahmedabad district